Silverwing is a best-selling children's novel, written by Kenneth Oppel, first published in 1997 by HarperCollins. It tells the story of a colony of silverwing bats. The tone and artistic ambition of this series of bestsellers has been compared to the classic animal novel Watership Down. Silverwing is the first installment of the Silverwing series, though it is chronologically the second novel in the sequence after Darkwing.

Plot

Part I
Shade is a young Silverwing bat whose father disappeared before he was born. He lives with his mother, Ariel, and is bullied by other newborns, especially Chinook and his friends, for being the runt of his colony. Shade challenges Chinook to look at the sun, an act forbidden by the owls. When Chinook backs down from the challenge, Shade looks at the sun, attracting the attention of an owl. Four elders, Bathsheba, Aurora, Lucretia and Frieda, try to discipline Shade at Tree Haven, the Silverwings' roost. Instead, Frieda takes Shade to an Echo Chamber storing the history of the bats and their rivalry with the owls. She shows him a metal band on her wrist and says that the bat goddess, Nocturna, gave it to her as part of a promise that bats would one day return to the sun.

The group of owls, led by General Brutus, come to Tree Haven to get payback on Shade. When the bats refuse to hand over Shade, the owls set the tree on fire. Despite Bathsheba's complaints, Frieda orders the colony to join the males at Stone Hold and, from there, they migrate to their winter retreat of Hibernaculum. Before the journey, Ariel teaches Shade a sound map, which uses landmarks, such as a cathedral, a valley shaped like a wolf's head and a waterfall. While Shade's colony is migrating, a strong storm breaks out and separates Shade from his colony. Shade lands on a human fishing boat and meets Marina, a Brightwing bat who, like Frieda, is banded. A passing Graywing colony offers to help Shade relocate the Silverwings. However, he decides to go with Marina instead upon hearing that banded bats are not welcome in their group.

Part II
After making it to the city, Shade and Marina are almost mutilated by pigeons, who have mistaken them for carnivorous bats. They escape to a cathedral, where they meet an albino bat named Zephyr, who puts Shade to sleep with a mysterious leaf. When Shade wakes up, he sees humans for the first time, praying in the cathedral. Zephyr tells Shade that he is a seer who has foreseen where Shade must go to find Frieda. He also says that Shade's father, Cassiel, is still alive. 

On the way out, Shade and Marina are attacked by an owl. The owl is eaten by two carnivorous bats, Goth and Throbb. Goth and Throbb are responsible for the death of the pigeons and, like Marina, both are banded. Shade offers to escort Goth and Throbb south in return for Goth and Throbb's protection from owls. Goth and Throbb agree, but Goth secretly formulates a plan to feed off the other Silverwings upon finding them. Goth is worried about Marina, who might affect Shade, and instructs Throbb to kill her. However, Throbb mistakes another Brightwing bat for Marina and Shade sees Throbb eating it. This puts Shade and Marina on alert and they see Goth and Throbb shot by humans as Shade and Marina make their escape.

Part III
Shade and Marina flee to the sewers of a human town, near the valley in the shape of a wolf's head. In the sewer, they are again mistaken for carnivorous bats by a rat named Remus. However, Remus' brother, Romulus, believes their story and guides them out of the sewer. Outside the tunnel, Shade and Marina are sighted and caught by Goth and Throbb, who threaten to eat them unless Shade guides them to Hibernaculum. Shade feigns acceptance long enough to put Goth and Throbb to sleep with some of the leaves he saw Zephyr use. Having a head start, Shade and Marina fly toward a storm. When Goth and Throbb follow, Goth steals Marina's band in the struggle. However, the bands make them function as lightning rods and lightning strikes, killing Throbb and supposedly killing Goth. Shade and Marina continue to Ariel's last landmark, the waterfall. This allows them to find Hibernaculum. The Silverwings adopt Marina while other bats in the Silverwing colony, including Shade, prepare a journey to find out the truth about the bands and locate Shade's father, Cassiel.

Characters
Shade - A young Silverwing bat, the runt of his colony. Shade is clever and resourceful, easily outwitting Goth on more than one occasion. Shade also is patient, not rushing his decisions, and is the more skeptical of Scirocco's transformation. However, he is also slightly greedy for power and is nearly persuaded by Goth into eating meat. Shade's curiosity was what caused Tree Haven to be burned down and the ensuing war, but it also causes Shade to know more about the bands than most other bats. Shade also tries very hard to look good in front of the other newborns, like daring Chinook to see the sun in the first place and veering away from Ariel when she offered to fly for both of them, causing him to be lost in the storm. Son of Ariel and Cassiel, he is very impulsive and brave. Shade is described as having thick black fur and a deep chest, but smaller than the other bats and has a shorter wingspan.

Goth - A carnivorous Vampyrum Spectrum bat from the southern jungles. Goth is very ruthless, not caring for anyone unless he believes they can be used to his advantage. He is also cunning, planning to eat Shade before they arrive at Hibernaculum and eating all the Silverwing bats in their sleep. Goth looks down on Nocturna and the humans, because a human subjected him to scientific experimentation, and believes Zotz is the true master. Eventually, Goth's arrogance and underestimation of Shade lead to his downfall, as Shade drugs him and electrocutes him. Goth, however, is still alive to fight another day.

Marina - A Brightwing bat slightly older than Shade. Marina, although annoying at times, is devoutly loyal to Shade, abandoning Scirocco to follow him. She is also level-headed, being suspicious of Goth and Throbb, even before they revealed their true colors. Unlike Shade, she is not easily enraptured and impressed at Goth's size, which leads Goth to identify her as the main threat at first. But Marina is convinced that Shade has betrayed her when Shade appeases Goth, and rushes her decisions a lot.

Throbb (deceased) - A Vampyrum bat that Goth met in the scientific lab. Goth originally planned to eat him, but decided that he may be of use to him to find his way home. Throbb is dull-witted and easily manipulated by Goth. He mistakes another Brightwing bat for Marina when Goth asks him to kill her, thereby allowing Shade and Marina to escape. Throbb develops frostbite on his wings, which strengthens Goth's determination to get to Hibernaculum. He is killed by a thunderstorm.

Frieda - The chief elder of the Silverwing tribe. Unlike the other Silverwings, she does not ridicule Shade for his size and even shows him the secret Echo Chamber. Frieda is a lot like Shade, in that she wanted to see the sun when she was young. Frieda does what has to be done, even sacrificing Tree Haven to keep Shade safe. At Hibernaculum, Frieda argues for Shade and brings most of the Silverwing bats to follow him.

Zephyr - An albino bat and the Keeper of the city Spire. Zephyr is a bat traffic regulator, aiding other bats when they are migrating. Zephyr is also an oracle, and accurately predicts the events of the book before they even happen.

Bathsheba - An elder of the Silverwing tribe. Bathsheba is sort of the "anti-Frieda", in that she is hasty and impatient, and was even willing to sacrifice Shade for Tree Haven. Bathsheba is also conservative, abiding by the law, even though it is unfair, and has ambitions of usurping Frieda. At Hibernaculum, Bathsheba manages to convince some Silverwings to stay behind.

Ariel - Cassiel's mate and Shade's mother. Ever since Cassiel's supposed death, Ariel has been paranoid of the safety of her son. She saves Shade from the owls, and was willing to sacrifice herself to the owls before Frieda's intervention. She also teaches Shade the sound map in case he got lost (which he did). During the storm, Ariel offers to fly for both of them, but Shade refuses. At Hibernaculum, Ariel initially disbelieves Shade's claim that Cassiel is alive, but relents when Icarus, a friend of Cassiel, admits there is no proof that he is dead.

Scirocco (deceased) - The charismatic leader of a group of banded bats whom Shade and Marina meet in the mountains. Scirocco is a liar, using sound images and echolocation to delude the other bats to turn into humans and give him power. Scirocco totally ignores Shade, and uses his charm on Marina, whom he convinces to stay with them (although Marina later changes her mind). Shade and Marina unknowingly lead Goth and Throbb right to Scirocco's bats, and they eat them.

Romulus - A flying rat who is imprisoned for his wings. Romulus is curious about batkind, and regards them and rats as distant cousins. He spares Shade and Marina from the fate of drowning and digs a tunnel for them to escape.

Remus - The hyperactive, paranoid younger brother of Romulus. Remus is haughty and arrogant, not knowing that desertion is rampant in his kingdom. He also believes the king regards him highly when, in fact, the king despises him. Remus was about to drown Shade and Marina, but relents to Romulus' plea.

Chinook - The most promising Silverwing newborn. Chinook treats Shade as inferior, due to his size, but Chinook is also extremely dumb. He believes his father has a wingspan of three feet (somewhere in the Goth range) and even forgets Hibernaculum's name until Shade reminds him. Chinook, although boastful, is a coward at heart, shying away from the sun before Shade does. Despite his flaws, Chinook agrees to go with Shade at Hibernaculum.

Cassiel - Ariel's mate and Shade's father. Cassiel is banded, along with many other males, and goes missing while searching for the truth of the bands. Ariel tells Shade that he was eaten by owls, but at Hibernaculum, Icarus tells Shade that Cassiel went inside a human building with another bat called Hanael. He is not actually seen in the book.

Nocturna - The goddess of the northern bats. Nocturna disapproved of the beasts' banishment of the bats, so she gave the bats the Promise that they will return to the sun. She gave the bats many things, like dark fur to camouflage in the night, echolocation and sound images. The metal bands given by the humans are a part of Nocturna's Promise, but many bats interpret the Promise differently. For instance, Scirocco says that Nocturna only selects the worthy to turn into humans, and the bands are given to the worthy, while Frieda concedes that they know nothing of the bands.

Zotz - Cama Zotz, or Zotz as he is called in the book, is the god of the Vampyrum Spectrum bats. Zotz' teachings are that, when a bat eats another bat, they absorb their energy, which is Goth's justification of cannibalism. Goth and Throbb follow Zotz' teachings fanatically, and even Shade is tempted slightly. According to Goth, Zotz is also worshipped by humans, unlike Nocturna.

Brutus - The general of the owls around Tree Haven. Brutus' owls burn down Tree Haven in response to Shade's actions.

Penelope - A Brightwing bat who is part of Scirocco's group.

Icarus - A male Silverwing elder. Icarus tells Ariel and Shade of Cassiel's whereabouts.

Aurora and Lucretia - The two other female Silverwing elders. They do not have a line in the whole book.

Jarod - Chinook's companion and sidekick. Jarod constantly praises Chinook for his hunting abilities.

Osric, Penumbra and Yara - Three Silverwings who are always seen together. They are friends with Chinook.

Owl Ambassador - The owl ambassador to the pigeons in the city. She questions Shade and Marina extensively, but the two refuse to relent. She then orders the pigeon captain to amputate their wings and returns to report to the royal house, but Shade and Marina escape harm.

Owls - Shade and Marina encounter two owls on their journey. Both try to eat them, but are unsuccessful. The first encounter, outside the city, was thwarted by Goth and Throbb, as they eat the owl in return. The second, after Shade had drugged Goth and Throbb, was scared away by Shade using sound imaging.

Pigeon Captain - The captain of the pigeons in the city. He questions Shade and Marina, and soon calls the owl ambassador. Later, the captain tries to amputate Shade and Marina's wings, but the two escape.

Private Saunders - A pigeon soldier in the city. He is gravely injured by Goth and Throbb, and attempts to convince the other pigeons that bats have three-foot wingspans. He is hauled away by the pigeon captain.

Humans - Humans make an appearance in the city. A scientist captures Goth and Throbb, banding them and subjecting them to experimentation, leading to Goth's mistrust and hatred of humans. Shade and Marina also see humans praying in Zephyr's cathedral, and are greatly impressed by them.

Television series

Silverwing has been adapted into an animated television miniseries, shown on the Canadian cable channel, Teletoon, and currently being shown on Toon Disney's Jetix. The episodes have also been strung together to make three films. The whole series is also available on DVD and iTunes.

External links
Silverwing at author's website

1997 Canadian novels
1997 children's books
Canadian children's novels
Canadian fantasy novels
Children's fantasy novels
Novels by Kenneth Oppel
Canadian novels adapted into plays
Silverwing (series)
Fictional bats
HarperCollins books
Children's novels about animals